Swarnamukhi is a river in southern India. This is an independent river which rises at an elevation of 300 m in the Eastern Ghats ranges near Pakala in Tirupati district and flows through 130 kms towards Bay of Bengal .The holy Hindu temples of Tirumala and Srikalahasti are located in the river basin. It was mentioned as Mogaleru in the works of Dhurjati.

Kalyani Dam with 25 million cubic meters live storage was constructed in 1977 across its tributary Kalyani river.

References

External links

Rivers of Andhra Pradesh
Tirupati district
Geography of Tirupati district
Rivers of India